Jennifer H. Mieres is an American cardiologist who wrote Heart Smart for Black Women and Latinas. Her documentary A Women’s Heart was nominated at the 46th Annual New York Emmy Awards.

References 

Living people
American cardiologists
Women cardiologists
African-American physicians
African-American women physicians
American women physicians
Year of birth missing (living people)
21st-century African-American people
21st-century African-American women